Jonathan Thompson Walton Zachary (c. May 7, 1896 – January 24, 1969) was a professional baseball pitcher.

Career

Zachary had a 19-year career in Major League Baseball that lasted from 1918 to 1936. He played for the Philadelphia A's, Washington Senators, St. Louis Browns, New York Yankees of the American League and the Boston Braves, Brooklyn Dodgers and Philadelphia Phillies of the National League.

Zachary is well known for giving up Babe Ruth's record-setting 60th home run in 1927. Then the next year, pitching for Ruth's team, the New York Yankees, he won the third game of the World Series, defeating the St. Louis Cardinals.

Zachary went 12–0 for the 1929 Yankees, which is still the major league record for most pitching wins without a loss in one season.

Zachary was a very good hitting pitcher, posting a .226 batting average (254-for-1122) with 79 runs, 6 home runs, 112 RBI and drawing 62 bases on balls. He had a career high 14 RBI in 1926 and batted a career high .306 (22-for-72) in 1928.

Zachary died on January 24, 1969, aged 72, after suffering a stroke.

References

External links

Major League Baseball pitchers
Philadelphia Athletics players
Washington Senators (1901–1960) players
St. Louis Browns players
New York Yankees players
Brooklyn Dodgers players
Boston Braves players
Philadelphia Phillies players
Guilford Quakers baseball players
Baseball players from North Carolina
1896 births
1969 deaths